Freakshow Vol 1: Tales of the Travelling Tunes is the fourth studio album from the Malaysian rock band Pop Shuvit, released in 2007 by their own record label, Shuvit Management. The album containing four songs previously included in their third album, Amped & Dangerous (2006) as well as new material and featuring collaborations with several artists. The album also is the band’s first album to have Malay-languaged songs. The song, "Marabahaya" used as the soundtrack of the Malaysian movie, Impak Maksima.

Track listing

Personnel
 Moots! - vocals
 JD - guitars
 AJ - bass
 Rudy - drums
 DJ Uno - turntables

References

External links
 Freakshow Vol.1: Tales of the Travelling Tunes at AllMusic

2007 albums
Pop Shuvit albums